"Summer Holiday" is a song recorded by Cliff Richard and the Shadows, written by rhythm guitarist Bruce Welch and drummer Brian Bennett. It is taken from the film of the same name, and was released as the second single from the film in February 1963. It went to number one in the UK Singles Chart for a total of two weeks. After that, the Shadows' instrumental "Foot Tapper"—also from the same film—took over the top spot for one week, before "Summer Holiday" returned to the top spot for one further week. The track is one of Richard's best known titles and it remains a staple of his live shows. It was one of six hits Richard performed at his spontaneous gig at the 1996 Wimbledon Championships when rain stopped the tennis.

The melody of the song is used in the chorus of the 1986 rap tune "Holiday Rap", by the Dutch duo MC Miker G & DJ Sven.

In 2019, the UK Government's Drinkaware campaign parodied Summer Holiday for a string of radio adverts and videos for the "No Alcoholiday" initiative to encourage people to have drink-free days.

Chart performance

Summer Holiday

'Notes:'''  Not all New Zealand chart weeks were published in Billboard. The record may have charted higher.

Dancing Shoes
The B-side "Dancing Shoes" also entered some charts, some of which are listed below.

References

External links
Song info

Holiday songs
1963 singles
Cliff Richard songs
UK Singles Chart number-one singles
Number-one singles in Australia
Number-one singles in Denmark
Dutch Top 40 number-one singles
Number-one singles in Norway
Number-one singles in Sweden
Songs from musicals
Songs written for films
Pinky and Perky songs
Songs written by Bruce Welch
Songs written by Brian Bennett
1963 songs
Columbia Graphophone Company singles
Song recordings produced by Norrie Paramor